Zafer Şakar (born 25 September 1985) is a Turkish former football midfielder.

Club career
Şakar played for Galatasaray, Denizlispor, Samsunspor, Beylerbeyi S.K., Boluspor, Diyarbakırspor, Güngörenspor and Gaziantep Büyükşehir Belediyespor. Zafer is a product of the Galatasaray Youth Team.

International career
Şakar played for Turkey at the 2005 FIFA World Youth Championship in the Netherlands.

References

1985 births
Sportspeople from Malatya
Living people
Turkish footballers
Turkey youth international footballers
Association football midfielders
Galatasaray S.K. footballers
Manisaspor footballers
Denizlispor footballers
Samsunspor footballers
Beylerbeyi S.K. footballers
Boluspor footballers
Diyarbakırspor footballers
Gaziantep F.K. footballers
İstanbul Güngörenspor footballers
Batman Petrolspor footballers
Süper Lig players
TFF First League players
TFF Second League players
TFF Third League players